Old Money is the eighth  studio album by American guitarist and composer Omar Rodríguez-López, his first with Stones Throw Records who released CD and MP3 versions on November 10, 2008 and a vinyl version in February 2009. Rodríguez-López explained that the album is "loosely based on the concept of exploitative industrialists and, well, their old money."

Rodriguez-Lopez has hinted that this record was a thematic sequel to the 2006 album Amputechture by his band The Mars Volta.

Review aggregate site Metacritic calculates a score of 70/100 for the album, but erroneously referred to it as "The debut album for the Mars Volta guitarist".

In the song "I Like Rockefellers' First Two Albums, But After That...", there is a dialog from the movie El Topo, from Chilean director Alejandro Jodorowsky.

Track listing

Release history

Personnel
Omar Rodríguez-López – guitars (except 2), synths (except 6, 8), bass (2, 4, 5), keys (2, 4, 7, 10), Wurlitzer (2), theremin (3), effects and TV (6), percussion (8)
Juan Alderete – bass (1, 3, 7, 9, 10)
Adrian Terrazas-Gonzalez – woodwinds (5), percussion (7)
Marcel Rodriguez-Lopez – percussion (1, 4, 7, 9, 10), drums (5, 9, 10), synths (1, 2, 4, 5, 7, 9, 10), clavinet and keys (10)
Deantoni Parks – drums (1)
Cedric Bixler-Zavala – drums (2)
Jon Theodore – drums (3, 7)

References

2008 albums
Stones Throw Records albums
Omar Rodríguez-López albums
Albums produced by Omar Rodríguez-López